Aïn Kihel is a district in Aïn Témouchent Province, Algeria. It was named after its capital, Aïn Kihel.

Municipalities 
The district is further divided into 4 municipalities:
Aïn Kihel
Aghlal
Aoubellil
Aïn Tolba

References 

Districts of Aïn Témouchent Province